Carlos Ariel Borges (14 January 1932 – 5 February 2014) was a Uruguayan footballer who played for Uruguay national team. He is best known for scoring the first ever goal in the history of Copa Libertadores. He is also one of the three Uruguayan footballers ever to score a hat-trick in FIFA World Cup. He achieved this feat in 1954 FIFA World Cup against Scotland.

Borges earned 35 caps and scored 10 goals for the national team from 1954 to 1959. He represented the nation in the 1954 FIFA World Cup, in which they finished fourth. He was part of the squad which won 1956 South American Championship two years later. Borges died on 5 February 2014 at the age of 82.

References

 

1932 births
2014 deaths
Footballers from Montevideo
Uruguayan footballers
Uruguayan expatriate footballers
Uruguay international footballers
Peñarol players
Racing Club de Avellaneda footballers
Uruguayan Primera División players
Argentine Primera División players
Expatriate footballers in Argentina
1954 FIFA World Cup players
Copa América-winning players
Association football forwards